Rajbari Sadar is an upazila of Rajbari District in the Division of Dhaka, Bangladesh.

Geography
It has 48513 households and total area 313 km2.

Demographics
As of the 1991 Bangladesh census, Rajbari Sadar has a population of 263555. Males constitute 51.46% of the population, and females 48.54%. This Upazila's eighteen up population is 133985. Rajbari Sadar has an average literacy rate of 32.3% (7+ years), and the national average of 32.4% literate.

Administration
Rajbari Sadar Upazila is divided into Rajbari Municipality and 14 union parishads: Alipur, Banibaha, Barat, Basantapur, Chandani, Dadshi, Khankhanapur, Khanganj, Mizanpur, Mulghar, Panchuria, Ramkantapur, Shahid Wahabpur, and Sultanpur. The union parishads are subdivided into 200 mauzas and 209 villages.

Rajbari Municipality is subdivided into 9 wards and 31 mahallas.

Education

There are five colleges in the upazila: Belgachi Bikalpa College, Bir Muktijoddha Morji Delowara College, Dr. Abul Hossain Degree College, Government Adarsha Mohila College Rajbari, and Rajbari Government College.

According to Banglapedia, Raja Surja Kumar Institute, founded in 1888, Rajbari Government High School (1892), and Yeasin High School (1950) are notable secondary schools.

See also
Upazilas of Bangladesh
Districts of Bangladesh
Divisions of Bangladesh

References

Upazilas of Rajbari District